Coleophora flabelligerella is a moth of the family Coleophoridae. It is found in Iran.

References

flabelligerella
Moths described in 1919
Moths of the Middle East